Muyenga is a hill in Kampala, the capital of Uganda and the largest city in that country. The name also applies to the upscale community that sits on that hill.

Location
Muyenga is located in Makindye Division, one of the five administrative  divisions of Kampala. It is bordered by Bukasa to the east, Kiwuliriza to the north, Kisugu and Kabalagala to the west, Kansanga to the southwest, Kiwafu to the south and Kyeyitabya to the southeast. The coordinates of Muyenga Hill are:0°17'38.0"N, 32°36'41.0"E (Latitude:0.293900; Longitude:32.611400).

Overview
For that reason, the hill was chosen to house the water storage tanks for National Water and Sewerage Corporation, which supply Kampala, Kira and Mukono. Because of the water tanks, Muyenga is also known as Tank Hill. The hill commands expansive views of the city towards the north and the west. To the east and the south the predominant view is that of nearby Lake Victoria.

Prior to Uganda's Independence in 1962 and through the 1960s and 1970s, Muyenga was an upscale residential area, on account of the excellent views and cool breezes. After the removal of the Obote II regime in 1986, there followed a period of rapid, unplanned and uncoordinated development of the real estate on Muyenga. As a result, it is an area with good houses but with a chaotic road and drainage system. Many of the property owners on the hill are from government and business who bought plots and put up expensive buildings without conforming to the rules of urban planning. Kabalagala, a neighborhood to the west of Muyenga, suffered from the same mismanagement of urban planning.

Points of interest
The following points of interest lie on Muyenga Hill or near it:
 Water storage tanks of the National Water and Sewerage Corporation
 Hotel International 2000 - from this hotel, you have an excellent view of Lake Victoria
 Kampala International University (KIU) - one of the 30 universities in Uganda
 Acacia International School, Uganda
 Diplomate Hotel 
 Kabalagala - Location of numerous restaurants, bars and nightclubs.
The British School of Kampala

See also

References

External links
Ownership of Hotel Diplomate

Neighborhoods of Kampala
Makindye Division